Joshua Hedley, born and raised in Naples, Florida, is a country music singer-songwriter, violinist, and guitarist. His debut album Mr. Jukebox was released in 2018 through Third Man Records.

Biography

Joshua "Josh" Hedley was born and raised in Naples, Florida. He felt "inexplicably drawn" to the fiddle as a child, requesting one by name from his parents at 3. He got his first violin at 8. By 12, he was playing with "middle-aged pickers" at the local VFW. Hedley credits the "ear training" he received through learning the fiddle early in life has helped him become a better singer.

When he turned 19, he moved to Nashville where he became an "in-demand sideman" at Robert's Western World and other venues. He became known around the Lower Broad district of Nashville – where he developed his sound. "I always thought Josh was the best thing going on down on Broadway," says Margo Price, who used Hedley's fiddle on All American Made. "No one carries on the tradition the way Ol’ Hed does. He grew up in it, worked on his chops and earned his place in that world. Now the world gets to hear it."

He became known as "Mr. Jukebox" while playing down on Broad "thanks to Hedley's pristine vocals, unrivaled musicianship, and truly encyclopedic knowledge of country music." He's toured with artists such as Jonny Fritz, Justin Townes Earle, Willie Watson, and others. He was featured in the 2015 documentary Heartworn Highways Revisited. Hedley was listed as one of ten country music acts to watch by Rolling Stone magazine in November 2016.

Hedley was featured on an online variety show hosted by Ketch Secor of Old Crow Medicine Show on YouTube Live. The series has also featured Charlie Worsham and Molly Tuttle.

Hedley "maintains a Monday night residency" at Robert's Western World in Nashville, performing there weekly. Margo Price's version of "Ragged Old Truck", featuring Hedley, was released November 2022 on Live Forever: A Tribute To Billy Joe Shaver by New West Records. Also contributing to the 12-song set were Willie Nelson and Lucinda Williams, George Strait, Miranda Lambert, Nathaniel Rateliff, Steve Earle, and Rodney Crowell.

Sobriety 
Hedley started writing his own songs after getting sober. As he says of this change in his life:

Livestreaming 
On March 17, 2020, Hedley and his group the Hedliners, together with Dave Cox, played their first livestreamed show at Robert's Western World, where he'd performed "thousands of times" since 2005. Playing to an empty dance floor, after area bars and music venues were shut down in response to the COVID-19 virus threat, Hedley and his musicians made more in virtual Venmo and PayPal tips from fans worldwide than they would on a regular night at the venue.

The performance garnered 53,000 views online within a few days, far more exposure than the 200-fan maximum venue could generate on a given night.

Festivals 
Hedley headlined the ISOL-AID festival with Leah Flanagan and Wilco’s Jeff Tweedy in May 2020. He appears September 2022 at AmericanaFest in Nashville, sharing stage with such acts as Lukas Nelson, Taj Majal, and Lori McKenna.

Touring 
When asked about upcoming tour dates by Chip Midnight of The Big Takeover in late April 2022, Hedley replied:
Hedley has previously toured with Jonny Fritz, Justin Townes Earle, Willie Watson, and others. He returns to Australia in November 2022 to tour in support of his "sophomore" album, Neon Blue. Making stops in Melbourne, Castlemaine, and Brisbane, supported by Emily Nenni.

Mr. Jukebox 
Hedley released his debut album Mr. Jukebox in 2018. It was named for his "uncanny ability to perform nearly any classic-country song thrown his way."

Tracks
Counting All My Tears (3:15)
Mr. Jukebox (3:16)
Weird Thought Thinker (2:57)
Let's Take a Vacation (3:51)
These Walls (2:49)
I Never (Shed a Tear) (2:14)
This Time (2:36)
Don't Waste Your Tears (3:59)
Let Them Talk (1:59)
When You Wish Upon a Star (2:59)

Hedley selected the only cover on the album, his final track version of "When You Wish Upon a Star", to honor his father, who died before seeing his son succeed in music. As the grateful son says, "We spent a lot of Christmases at Disney World. When I was searching for a cover song, it dawned on me that my dad didn't get to see any of this happen, but he always wanted it."

Hedley says of the type of music he wants to make, and where that fits him in the Nashville music scene:

Reception

Neon Blue 
Hedley released his second album Neon Blue in 2022. He has said that Neon Blue sounds like a mid-‘90s honky-tonk anthem. "The last bastion of country music was the early 1990s, roughly 1989 and 1996," Hedley said. "You could turn on the radio and immediately know you’re hearing a country song. You could still hear steel guitar and fiddle." Joe Diffie's death from COVID-19 in 2020 was the primary inspiration for the album, according to Hedley, who says of the effort: "After these last couple years we’ve had, I felt like I didn’t want to hang my sad-sack, typical brand on people. I wanted to make a record that people could party to."

Tracks
Broke Again
Country & Western
Old Heartbroke Blues
The Last Thing in the World
Down to My Last Lie
Free (One Heart)
Neon Blue
Bury Me With My Boots On
Found in a Bar
Let's Make a Memory
Wonder If You Wonder
River in the Rain

Style 
Hedley has said that country music was perfected in 1965, a statement he admits "was a bit hyperbolic." He continues:

Discography
 Mr. Jukebox Third Man Records (2018)
 Neon Blue New West Records (2022)

Film
Heartworn Highways Revisited documentary (2015)

References

External links
 Official website
 Bio
Red Light Management: Joshua Hedley
AllMusic: Joshua Hedley
Heartworn Highway Revisited (2015)

Living people
People from Naples, Florida
American country singer-songwriters
American bluegrass musicians
Old-time musicians
American folk musicians
American country guitarists
American male guitarists
American harmonica players
Musicians from Nashville, Tennessee
Singer-songwriters from Florida
Singer-songwriters from Tennessee
Guitarists from Florida
Guitarists from Tennessee
21st-century American singers
Third Man Records artists
21st-century American violinists
1985 births